Tope de Coroa is a mountain on the island of Santo Antão's, Cape Verde. At 1,979 m elevation, it is the highest point of the island. It is in the western part of the island, 25 km west of the island capital Porto Novo. The mountain is entirely of volcanic origin. The area is the source of several streams including Ribeira de Monte Trigo which flows westward to Monte Trigo. 

The mountain forms part of a natural park, covering . It contains 61% of the endemic angiosperm plants of Cape Verde, of which 25% are in the red list of endangered species, including Periploca laevigata subsp. chevalieri. Free grazing is a threat to the biodiversity of the area. Tope de Coroa consists of relatively young volcanic rock, formed between 200,000 and 170,000 years ago.

See also
 List of mountains in Cape Verde
 List of Ultras of Africa

References

External links
Áreas protegidas, Cabo Verde 

Coroa
Geography of Santo Antão, Cape Verde
Porto Novo Municipality